Herbert Benjamin "Deke" Brackett (January 2, 1911 – November 14, 1970) was an American football player and coach.

Brackett played quarterback at the University of Tennessee from 1931 to 1933. He played in the same backfield as halfback Beattie Feathers, future College Football Hall of Famer and NFL All-Decade Team member. After graduating, Brackett remained at Tennessee as an assistant. After stints at The Citadel and Hampden-Sydney, he returned to Tennessee as an assistant to new head coach John Barnhill. Brackett followed Barnhill to Arkansas in 1946. Following Barnhill's resignation after the 1949 season, Brackett moved to UCLA where he was the Bruins' backfield coach until 1962.

Brackett returned to coaching as an assistant with the Orlando Panthers of the Continental Football League. He returned to college football in 1968 when his head coach with the Panthers, Perry Moss hired him to work on his staff at Marshall University.

Brackett died in the 1970 plane crash that killed  most of the Marshall football team and coaching staff and several team boosters. Brackett was supposed to go on a recruiting trip with fellow assistant William "Red" Dawson, however graduate assistant Gail Parker gave Brackett his seat and went on the recruiting trip instead.

References

1911 births
1970 deaths
American football quarterbacks
Arkansas Razorbacks football coaches
Continental Football League coaches
Hampden–Sydney Tigers football coaches
Marshall Thundering Herd football coaches
Tennessee Volunteers football coaches
Tennessee Volunteers football players
The Citadel Bulldogs football coaches
UCLA Bruins football coaches
Accidental deaths in West Virginia
Victims of aviation accidents or incidents in the United States